Javier Tebas Medrano (born 31 July 1962) is a Spanish lawyer and the president of Liga Nacional de Fútbol Profesional, the association responsible for administering Spain's two professional football leagues. First elected in April 2013, he was re-elected for a third term in December 2019.

Biography

His expertise in business, sports and bankruptcy law was decisive in advising and representing numerous football clubs throughout his career and in creating a law firm specializing in the world of sport.

Tebas has worked for eleven La Liga clubs, with his first role being president of SD Huesca in 1993. He served three terms as the Vice-President of Liga Nacional de Fútbol Profesional, being elected for the first time in 2001, and also worked for the G30 group of clubs, where he helped the clubs negotiate their television deals.

In 2013, Tebas was appointed the president of La Liga after an uncontested election in which he was supported by 32 of the 42 La Liga and Segunda División clubs. Prior to the election, Tebas had promised to clean up the Spanish game after match-fixing allegations, and also to make match tickets affordable.

Tebas studied law at the University of Zaragoza. During his student days, he was a provincial delegate of the far-right party's youth, Fuerza Nueva, a reminiscence of Franco's regime nostalgics .  Tebas is a supporter of Real Madrid, although he has said that this does not affect his neutrality as president.

The arrival of Javier Tebas as president saw a radical change in the performance of La Liga. Among the key initiatives to have been introduced since he took the role of vice president (and later president) are: economic restructuring of the clubs and financing of La Liga, achieved by the centralised sale of television broadcasting rights; tough measures against match-fixing; establishing policies to tackle violence or abuse in the stadiums; and digitalization and multimedia development that allows fans to interact with the clubs across multiple channels.

Regarding the centralised sale of television rights, this was a process that was achieved following the formation of the G-30, a group of clubs that united for the sale of their television rights, of which Javier Tebas was one of the main promoters. Since 2003, Tebas has taken a stance in favour of the centralised sale of television rights through LaLiga. His work as head of the G-30 has gradually reduced the income gap between large and small clubs.

Another of his achievements within LaLiga has been the financial restructuring of the clubs. The large amounts of debt the football clubs had, led to the members themselves, the clubs, to self-impose strict economic and financial control measures that would be applied by LaLiga. For this task, Tebas called upon Javier Gomez, former vice president of Valencia CF, appointing him as his second in command and Managing Director with the responsibility of enforcing the new internal regulations.

Following the implementation of economic control from 2013 onwards, LaLiga reported that during the first four years of Tebas’s tenure, debts to the treasury were reduced by 71% (from €647 million to €184 million) and total revenues increased by 48% (from €2.236 million to €3.327 million) in June 2017.

In this regard, former football player and coach Jorge Valdano said of him:"Although we differ ideologically, I will say that Tebas did more for Spanish football than all his critics combined. Whatever his future holds, he won't go backwards, because his style is to be on front line. Since his arrival, LaLiga has become richer, more democratic in its distribution of money, more rigorous with its contracts, more professional in how it stages matches and more respectful of its sense of identity. No one did more or risked more to make sure LaLiga could reach these ends". Jorge Valdano "Tebas and Mr. Lobo" El País, July 31, 2020.The centralised management of audiovisual rights made it possible to incorporate many changes and significantly increase the income of the clubs. In order to increase its television audience, match schedules were adapted so that the games did not coincide with each other and could each have a distinct kick-off time; these measures were applauded internationally but drew criticism among Spanish viewers.

Controversies
During his tenure, Tebas has said that Spanish league matches could be held outside of Spain, following the path of leagues such as the NBA in playing regular season matches abroad. The plans are to hold one match per season outside of Spain and Tebas has said that El Clásico would not be one of the matches selected, LaLiga’s attempts to organise and hold a match in Miami have so far been stopped by the Spanish Football Federation (RFEF), who are against it.

He has also said that if the Catalonia region became independent from Spain, then its football teams, including FC Barcelona and RCD Espanyol, would not be allowed to compete in the Spanish football leagues.

In January 2019, Tebas announced his support for the Far right nationalist Vox party. Saying "They seem good to me", Tebas said on Cadena Cope. "I've been saying it for a while. Spain needed an alternative like Vox. You have to respect the 400,000 people that have voted for them in Andalucia. If they stay on this line then I will vote for Vox." In the 2019 Spanish general election, Vox obtained 4 million votes and 52 seats, becoming the third-largest political presence and ceasing to be a minor political party in Spain.

Tebas was critical of former UEFA acting president Ángel María Villar, who also headed the Royal Spanish Football Federation for many years. In 2017, Villar was arrested and jailed on corruption charges. Tebas has also been critical of FIFA, saying that they need an overhaul of personnel in order to regain the trust of the footballing community. Tebas blamed FIFA for contract information leaks by the Football Leaks website about contract details of La Liga players.

Tebas has led opposition to the European Super League or any UEFA plan to establish a system of semi-closed European competitions that gives more power to big clubs at the cost of medium and small clubs. His reasoning is that these proposals would mean the end of football as we know it today and would be very harmful to national leagues and clubs, as well as fans, who could see their local clubs disappear.

Tebas also argues that the plans would be damaging to the big clubs and organisers of these proposed ‘superleagues’. Tebas claims that although the plans may appear lucrative for this small group of clubs, in the long run fans would lose interest and the clubs would lose income.

The current superleague debate has been ongoing in the football industry since 2019. In May of the same year, all the national leagues in Europe met in Madrid, at an event coordinated by LaLiga, to express their disapproval of any such plans.

Tebas has also been a vocal critic of what he deems "financial doping" within football. He has stated that state-run football clubs are a "danger" to the sport.

References

1962 births
Living people
Spanish business executives
La Liga
20th-century Spanish lawyers
People from San José, Costa Rica
Spanish football chairmen and investors
University of Zaragoza alumni
21st-century Spanish lawyers